A.K.M. Mohiuddin Ahmed (died 28 January 2010) was a Bangladesh Army officer who was convicted in absentia and executed for the assassination of Sheikh Mujibur Rahman. On 28 January 2010, Rahman was hanged along with Syed Faruque Rahman, Sultan Shahriar Rashid Khan, Mohiuddin Ahmed, and Mohammad Bazlul Huda in Old Dhaka Central Jail.

Career
In 1975, Ahmed and a few other mid ranking army officers, displeased with the direction the government of Bangladesh was heading, decided to overthrow President Sheikh Mujibur Rahman and replace him with an Islamic government led by Khandaker Moshtaque Ahmed. They attacked the residence of Sheikh Mujib on 15 August 1975. After Sheikh Mujib and most of his family members were killed, Ahmed went with the other officers to form a command council and a government headed by Moshtaque. After the killing he was posted to a diplomatic mission in Tripoli, Libya.

Ahmed fled to the United States in 1996, the same year Bangladesh Awami League returned to power. He applied for asylum but was rejected and ordered to be deported from the United States on 2002. On 18 June 2007 Ahmed was deported from the United States after fighting a prolonged legal battle to remain in the United States. He had been detained US Immigration and Customs Enforcement on 13 March 2007. His home in Patuakhali was burned down on 18 November 2009 by locals.

Trial
2 October 1996 AFM Mohitul Islam filed the case over the attack on Sheikh Mujib with Dhanmondi Police Station. On 8 November 1998 Ahmed and 14 others were sentenced to death in the case filed over the murder of Sheikh Mujib and his family. 30 April 2001, Bangladesh High Court confirmed the death sentences of 12.

Death
On 28 January 2010, Ahmed's mercy petition was rejected by the President of Bangladesh. On 28 January 2010, Ahmed was hanged along with Sultan Shahriar Rashid Khan, Mohiuddin Ahmed, Syed Farooq Rahman, and Mohammad Bazlul Huda in Dhaka Central Jail. He was buried in Galachipa Upazila in Patuakhali District.

References

2010 deaths
Assassination of Sheikh Mujibur Rahman
People convicted of murder by Bangladesh
Bangladeshi lieutenant colonels
Executed Bangladeshi people
People executed by Bangladesh by hanging
Place of birth missing
Year of birth missing